Garlands bearers, typically in the form of small naked putti holding up a continuous garland very large in relation to their size, formed a popular ornamental design in classical arts, from the Greco-Roman world to India, with ramifications as far as China.  In Europe they were revived in the Renaissance, and continued in later periods.

Greco-Roman art
The garland-bearer design was extremely popular in the Mediterranean. It first appeared at the end of the Hellenistic period, and its popularity expanded during the Roman period. The design reached a peak of popularity in the 2nd century CE, adorning sarcophagi made in Asia Minor to be sold in Rome.

Greek garland bearer designs tend to be continuous, and the garlands are furnished with leaves and stems. Roman garland bearer designs are segmented and often use flowers and fruits for decoration.

Garland bearers were also particularly associated to the cult of Dyonisos.

Central Asia

Indian art
The erotes or putti holding garlands is one of the most common motif of the Greco-Buddhist art of Gandhara. According to John Boardman, they find their origin in Hellenistic designs, rather than Roman ones. The garlands had an important role in decorating Buddhist stupas.

China

The garland bearer design can be seen in Buddhist frescoes in Miran, China, from the 3rd century CE.

References

Architectural sculpture
Visual motifs
Ornaments (architecture)